Dick Jackson (born c. 1878) was an English footballer and manager who played for Middlesbrough and Sunderland as a Central defender and later managed the English football club Darlington from 1912 to 1919. Under his management, Darlington won the North Eastern League title in 1913.

References

External links
Dicky Jackson's careers stats at The Stat Cat

1870s births
English footballers
Middlesbrough F.C. players
Sunderland A.F.C. players
Darlington F.C. managers
Year of death missing
Association football defenders
English football managers